Borokalia Nashkara is a revenue village under South Salmara in Dhudri district. There are several other small villages associated with this village. A revenue village consisting of about 10 small villages. This also covered the Nashkara Gaon Panchayat. The distance from Nashkara village to the state capital Dispur is around 177 km. The state capital of Lucknow is different from Nashkara and is 245.5 km. Nearby prosperous capitals include Silong 184.6 km, Gangtok 213.7 km, Agartala 261.9 km.

Name Origin 
There is no proper history or evidence on how the name of this village was Borokalia Nashkara. But according to a report, in the old days, there was a Raba named "Naskar" living in the area. And the name of the village is Nashkara as per the name of the same one. Another report says that dates "juice" were produced more in this village in the old days. And elderly people also called "juice" as "nos". Therefore, the "made" verb is said to have been added and discarded as the juice or the nos were produced in this place. (i.e. the place where the juice is made)

Peoples 
According to the Census 2011 the population of the most visited village is 8273 and among them 4180 males and 4093 females.

Villages of Nashkara Village 
 Choochbari
 Dhapan Para
 Boro Nashkara
 Soto Nashkara
 Nashkara Bilpara
 Chinabari
 Radhuram Chala
 Shershow Bhanger Par
 Shimulchala
 Amchala

The village and distance near the Nashkara 
 Bauskata 7.7 km,
 Baladoba 6.9 km,
 Rawatary 6.6 km,
 Hamidabad 5.4 km,
 Tumani 11.0 km,
 Fakirganj 5.4 km,
 Patakata 13.8 km,
 Airkata  4.0 km.

language 
The first language of The Nashkara is Assamese, Bengali. Though the public language of the village is Assamese but most people use the Bengali at home or with others. A public event or government office can only be seen using Assamese language. Besides, it is also forced to speak Assamese language in school colleges etc. People from Nashkara village can be seen using Assamese language for communication when they go to the city or city or other places in Assam.

Special 
The Nashkara village is located in the UTC 5.30 time area and following this Indian Standard Time (IST). The time when the snare swells is changed from IST to 30 minutes. The direction of driving vehicles in the Nashkara is left and all vehicles have to be left while driving. The national currency of the Nashkara is used by the people of India and its international currency code is INR. Nashkara phones and mobiles can be accessed by associating the Indian country's dialing code +91 from abroad. People of The Nashkara follow the format dated day/month/year in the dally life.

Main Occupation 
Most of the people in this village are living in agriculture. A few people do government jobs. Though the main occupation of the village is agriculture but there is not enough land, the villagers have made a different way. For example, some people shopkeeping. Some fishing, some go to Guwahati or other states and work in a private company. Some have again made money by setting up non-government schools. Some work in the textile industry (looms) of Assam. In looms, the cloth sits on the ground and sells them to the places of The Meghalaya, Hatsingimari, Mankachar etc.

Crops produced in the plantation 
Rice, Jute, Wheat, Sari, Tichi, Peas, Boots, Sugarcane, Chillies, Potatoes, Vendors, Kerala, Jatilao, Pumpkin, Tomatoes, Beans, Cabbage, Cauliflower, Oalkavi, Belas, Carrots, Onion, Garlic etc.

Traffic 
Most roads or roads in Nashkara village are raw. Though some roads are seen to be wet but they are very bad.

Railway Station 
The railway station near Naska is Dhubri railway station which is about 13.9 km away (which is to be taken by water way). The following table shows its distance from other railway stations and Mamakudy.

Airport 
The airport near Rupsi which is 28.9 km from Nashkara village away. It was built by the British government during World War II. Mainly for military purposes. Till 1983, Indian Airlines and some private commercial flights operated regularly between Kolkata, Guwahati and Dhubri. The port was closed for almost 36 years thereafter. The GoI is yet to complete the repair of this Rupsi airport after nearly 36 years.

Town 
The city/important place near the Borokalia Nashkara village is 14.1 km away from Dhubri district. The cities surrounding the Nashkara are as follows.

Educational Institutions 
There are a number of government and non-government educational institutions in the country. Which have been playing a great role in building the future of the students of this region.

Government Schools 
 Dakhin Nashkara Bilpara LP School
 Santipur Boraibar Girls ME Madrassa
 West Shimuchala LP School
 174 No Amchala LP School
 Barkalia Nashkara High School
 2163 No A.K. Mondal Memorial LP School

 Abu Bakkar Bepari Memorial LP School
 Jyoti High Madrassa
 Shershow Bhangerpar Girls School
 JU Ahmed Memorial LP School
 Chinabari LP School
 Nashkara Noyapara LP School
 1185 No Nashkara LP School
 Shimualchala LP School
 Chandipara LP School
 Radhuram Chariali Pre-Sanior Madrasa
 B N Bilpara LP School
 Barkalia Noshkora Navamilan ME School
 Khedaimari Char LP School
 267 No Baro Kaliarpar LP School
 Mir Boxo Khan Memorial LP School
 Radhuram Chala LP School
 Nashkara ME School
 Chandipara ME Madrasa

Private Sector Schools 
 Chandipara Smart Account, Chandipara
 MB Jatiya Bidyalaya, Radharam Chala
 Jonaky Jatiya Bidyalaya, Shimuchala
 Dr. Zakir Husain Academy, Amchala
 S.B. Vidhya Pith, Amchala

Data Collection 

Villages in Dhubri district